Lee David Vaughan (born 17 July 1986) is an English footballer who plays as a defender for Stourbridge. He played in the Football League for Cheltenham Town.

Career
A Birmingham City and Portsmouth trainee, Vaughan joined Walsall from Chelmsley Town in February 2005 in a non-contract basis. He had a loan spell at Willenhall Town, and subsequently moved to A.F.C. Telford United in the summer of 2006.

On 11 May 2010 Vaughan joined Kidderminster Harriers. He appeared in 157 league matches for Harriers, and was named in the 2012–13 Conference Team of the Year alongside teammates Josh Gowling and Anthony Malbon, a season when Harriers finished second in the league, before rejecting a new deal in May 2014.

On 19 May 2014 Vaughan signed a two-year deal with Football League Two club Cheltenham Town. He played his first match in the Football League on 9 August, starting in a 1–0 win at Bury. He was a regular in the side for the 2014–15 season, at the end of which Cheltenham were relegated to the National League, but could not keep his place in 2015–16. In November 2015, he joined another National League club, Tranmere Rovers, on loan, and the move was made permanent in January 2016 when Cheltenham cancelled his contract.

Despite missing the end of the 2016–17 National League season because of a broken leg, he was named in the National League Team of the Year. He rejoined Kidderminster Harriers in 2017, and returned to competitive action in December, playing regularly until the end of the National League North season and for the first half of the next. Vaughan then returned to the National League with Solihull Moors.

In June 2020, Vaughan re-joined AFC Telford United. He then joined Barnet in March 2021 on a deal until the end of the season.  He made 20 appearances for the Bees before leaving on the expiry of his contract.

Vaughan joined Stourbridge in June 2021.

Honours
AFC Telford United
Conference League Cup: 2008–09

Cheltenham Town
National League: 2015–16

Individual
Conference Premier Team of the Year: 2012–13

References

External links

1986 births
Living people
Footballers from Birmingham, West Midlands
English footballers
England semi-pro international footballers
Association football defenders
Chelmsley Town F.C. players
Walsall F.C. players
Willenhall Town F.C. players
AFC Telford United players
Kidderminster Harriers F.C. players
Cheltenham Town F.C. players
Tranmere Rovers F.C. players
Solihull Moors F.C. players
Barnet F.C. players
Stourbridge F.C. players
English Football League players
National League (English football) players
Southern Football League players